Akis Katsoupakis is a Greek musician, arranger and record producer.
His most commercially acclaimed album (arranged and co-produced) is Sokratis Malamas's  (2000) which includes the classic Prigkipesa.

His work includes arranging for multi-platinum albums (Eleftheria Arvanitaki – Ola Sto Fos) – (George Dalaras – )

Biography
Born and raised in Thessaloniki, Greece, he studied piano, classical harmony, and counterpoint. Later on, he took lessons in jazz theory and jazz piano and also seminars on electronic music (ICMC '97). Katsoupakis has been working as a professional keyboard player since 1989. After playing with several bands, in 1994 he joined the band Maskes, which turned out to be one of the bands that formed the so-called indie rock scene of Thessaloniki.

Since 1997 he has carried out orchestration and production for studio recordings and live concerts working with many of the industry's big names.
He also appears as a string section arranger, a sound engineer, programmer, mixer and mastering engineer.
His debut studio album as an arranger and producer was "Zilion" (1997).

Discography arranged by Akis Katsoupakis
 – Paschalis Arvanitides: Arrangement for track #2: Palia Mou Gitonia (1995, EMI SA)
 – Zilion: Whole album arrangement (1997, Ano Kato Records)
 – Dimitris Zervoudakis: Whole album arrangement (1998, Minos EMI)
 – Manthos Arbelias: Whole album arrangement (1998, Mylos Records)
 - Erasitehnes Erastes: Whole EP arrangement (1998, Ano Kato Records)
 – Maskes Whole album arrangement (1998, Ano Kato Records)
 – Theodosia Tsatsou: Whole album arrangement (1999, Minos EMI)
 – Sakis Rouvas: Arrangement and production for track #4: Kanoume Onira (2000, Minos EMI)
 – Eugene Dermitassoglou: Whole album production (2000, Mylos Records) 
 – Maskes: Whole EP arrangement and production (2000, Minos EMI)
 – Sokratis Malamas: Whole album arrangement and co-production (2000, Lyra)
 Pavlo Sidiropoulo - Various Artists: Arrangement for track #4:  performed by Maskes (2000 Minos EMI)
 – Iris Mavraki: Whole EP arrangement (2001, Fm Records)
 – Maskes: Whole album arrangement (2002, Minos EMI)
 (Remastered) – Nikos Portokaloglou Arrangement and production for track #12:  (2003, Minos EMI)
 – Haris Alexiou: Arrangement for tracks: #4: , #5: , #8:  (2003, Minos EMI)
 - Zak Stefanou: Whole album co-arrangement (2003 Sony Music)
 - Nikos Portokaloglou: Arrangements for String section, and Co-arrangements for the whole album (2003 Merury Universal)
Three Songs – Eleftheria Arvanitaki: Main EP arranger (2004, Universal)
 – Eleftheria Arvanitaki: Whole album arrangement (2004, Universal)
 – George Dalaras: Main album arranger (2005, Minos EMI)
 – Andriana Babali: Whole album arrangement and production (2005, Minos EMI)
 – Eleni Tsaligopoulou: Arrangement for tracks: #4: , #5: , #7:  (2005, Sony Music)
 - Nikos Ioakimidis: Arranged track #2:  (2006, Universal)
 – Kostas Antypas: Whole album arrangement (2007, Protasis)
 – Eleni Tsaligopoulou: Arrangement for tracks: #2: , #12:  (2008, Sony music)
 - La Pouppé – Stella Gadedi: Whole album arrangement (2008, Lyra)
 - Yorgos Kazantzis: Arrangement for track #6:  (2008, Polytropon)
 – Kostas Triantafyllides: Whole EP arrangement (2009, Music Post)
 - Kostas Livadas: Arrangement for track #10  (2010, Melody Maker Single Member P.C.)
Mona Lisa – Stella Gadedi featuring Antigone Buna: Whole album arrangement (2010, Lyra)
 – Andriana Babali: Whole album production and arrangement (2010, Minos EMI)
 - Trifono: Arrangement for tracks: #7:  & #9:  (2010 Trifono)
 - Kostas Antypas: Whole album Production & Arrangement (2012, Prospero)
Bras De Fer – Giorgos Astritis: Whole album Production and Arrangement (2013 – Mikros Heros)
 - Dimitris Livanos: Arrangement for tracks: #4:  and #10:  (2013 Music Links Knowledge)
 – Zacharias Karounis Album (7 tracks) production and arrangement (2013 – Mikri Arktos)
 – Andriana Babali: Whole album production and arrangement (2014, Feelgood Records)
 - Lavrentis Machairitsas & Yannis Kotsiras: Arrangements for all album, recorded live (2016, Minos EMI)
 - Andriana Babali & Rous: Single Production & Arrangement (2016, Feelgood Records)
 - Various Artists: Arrangement for track #26:  (2016, Feelgood Records)
 - Adam Tsarouchis: Single Production & Arrangement (2017 Hidden Track Records)
 – George Kiriakos: Whole album Production and Arrangement (2017 – Panik Records)
 - Konstantina Tsirimona: Single Production and Arrangement (2017,  Hidden Track Records)
 – Stamatis Chatziefstathiou: Whole album Production and Arrangement (2017, Technis Politeia)
FC Spot - Kirsten: Single Production and Arrangement (2017, Voice Entertainment)
Spell - Andriana Babali: Single Production and Arrangement (2018, Minos EMI)
 - Manos Pirovolakis: Single Production and Arrangement (2019, Mikros Heros)
 - Yanna Vasileiou: Single Production and Arrangement (2019, Panik Oxygen)
 - Evi Siamanta: Single Production and Arrangement (2019, Heaven Music)
 - Evi Siamanta: Single Production and Arrangement (2019, Heaven Music)
 - Evi Siamanta: Single Production and Arrangement (2019, Heaven Music)
Grecospectiva 90s - Various Artists: Production & Arrangement for track #12:  (2019 Amour Records)
 - Georgia Dagaki: Single Production and Arrangement (2020, Panik Oxygen)
 - Evi Mazi: Single Arrangement (2020, Mikros Heros)
 - Nikos Kouroupakis: Single Production and Arrangement (2020, Music Links Knowledge)
 - Andriana Babali: Single Production and Arrangement (2020, Minos EMI)
 - Andriana Babali: Single Production and Arrangement (2020, Minos EMI)
 - Various Artists: Single Production and Arrangement (2020, Ogdoo Music Group)
 - Rahil Tselepidou: Single Production and Arrangement (2021, Heaven Music)
 - Georgia Dagaki: Main album Arranger  (2021, Georgia Dagaki)
 - Rahil Tselepidou: Single Production and Arrangement (2021, Heaven Music)
 - Manos Pirovolakis: Single Production and Arrangement (2021, Ogdoo Music Group)
Apanemistas - Various Artists: Album Arrangement (2021, Apanemistas)
Carol Of The Jingle Bells - Fortissimo: Single Production and Arrangement (2021, Fortissimo)
 - Andriana Babali: Single Production and Arrangement (2022, bbli)
 - Andriana Babali: Single Production and Arrangement (2022, Minos EMI)

Arrangements for live shows
2004 – 2005 Haris Alexiou – Eleftheria Arvanitaki live shows across Greece.
2005 (Summer) Eleftheria Arvanitaki live tour in Spain
2006 Eleni Tsaligopoulou - Andriana Babali - Rallia Christidou Summer tour across Greece.
2006 – 2007 Orpheas Peridis - Georgia Dagaki Tour across Greece
2007 Andriana Babali –  "In the kitschen" Tour across Greece
2007 Eleni Tsaligopoulou – Yannis Kotsiras Summer tour
2008 Eleni Tsaligopoulou – Andriana Babali – Giota Nega : 
2009 Eleni Tsaligopoulou – Glykeria – Trifono Concerts in Athens
2011 Stella Gadedi  concert in Athens Concert Hall
2013 – 2014 Yannis Kotsiras – Thanos Mikroutsikos live shows across Greece and Cyprus
2013 – 2017 Yannis Kotsiras live shows across Greece and internationally 
2015 – 2016 Yannis Kotsiras – Lavrentis Machairitsas live shows across Greece and Cyprus
2016 – 2018 Babis Stokas live shows across Greece and Cyprus
2016 – Present Andriana Babali Quarderinas Quartet live shows across Greece and Cyprus
2017 - 2018 " in Concert" with Pandelis Thalassinos, Dimitris Kataleifos, Giannis Kotsiras, Stavros Zalmas, Stamatis Chatziefstathiou, Lina Nikolakopoulou, Vasilis Lekkas, Despina Bempedeli, Andriana Babali, Aris Lembesopoulos
2019 Vicky Karatzoglou Concerts in Athens
2022 Stamatis Chatziefstathiou concerts across Greece.

Collaborations
Haris Alexiou
Eleftheria Arvanitaki
Andriana Babali
Dimitris Bassis
Cayetano
George Dalaras
Stathis Drogosis
Petros Gaitanos
Yannis Kotsiras
Lavrentis Machairitsas
Sokratis Malamas
Thanos Mikroutsikos
Dimitris Mitropanos

Nikos Portokaloglou
Dionysis Savvopoulos
Babis Stokas
Eleni Tsaligopoulou
Tania Tsanaklidou
Theodosia Tsatsou
Maria Voumvaki
Dimitris Zervoudakis

References

External links
http://musicbrainz.org/show/artist/appears-on.html?artistid=671674
http://www.discogs.com/artist/Άκης+Κατσουπάκης
http://www.facebook.com/pages/akicats

1972 births
Living people
Greek record producers
Music arrangers
Musicians from Thessaloniki